Ančipova is a village in Šķilbēni Parish, Balvi Municipality, Latvia.

Ančipova is located very close to the Russian border, away from the state roads, on the bank of the border river Kukhva.

References 

Villages in Latvia
Balvi Municipality